Forgney is a civil parish and townland in County Longford, Ireland. Evidence of ancient settlement in the area include a number of ringfort and holy well sites in Forgney townland.

Forgney is associated with the poet Oliver Goldsmith, and the local Church of Ireland church, the Church of St. Munis, is where the Rev. Charles Goldsmith, father of the poet, administered from 1718 to 1730. The present church was built in 1810 and replaced that of Goldsmith's day. It is located on the R392 regional road. The church contains a stained glass window with a brass plaque erected in 1897 and inscribed:

The local Roman Catholic church, the Church of the Immaculate Conception, was built .

John Henry Patterson was born in Forgney in 1867. He was an Anglo-Irish soldier, hunter, Zionist and author known for his book The Man-eaters of Tsavo (1907), which details his experiences while building a railway bridge over the Tsavo river in Kenya in 1898-99. In the 1996 film The Ghost and the Darkness, he was portrayed by actor Val Kilmer. In the First World War, Patterson was the commander of the Jewish Legion.

References

Civil parishes of County Longford
Townlands of County Longford
Church of Ireland parishes in the Republic of Ireland